Malawi competed at the 2018 Commonwealth Games in the Gold Coast, Australia from April 4 to April 15, 2018.

Netball athlete Joyce Mvula was the country's flag bearer during the opening ceremony.

Competitors
The following is the list of number of competitors participating at the Games per sport/discipline.

Athletics

Men
Track & road events

Netball

Malawi qualified a netball team by virtue of being ranked in the top 11 (excluding the host nation, Australia) of the INF World Rankings on July 1, 2017.

Pool B

Seventh place match

See also
Malawi at the 2018 Summer Youth Olympics

References

Nations at the 2018 Commonwealth Games
Malawi at the Commonwealth Games
)ly